Melun is a commune in the Seine-et-Marne department in the Île-de-France region, north-central France. Melun is the prefecture of the Seine-et-Marne, and the seat of one of its arrondissements. Its inhabitants are called Melunais.

History
Meledunum began as a Gaulish town; Caesar noted Melun as "a town of the Senones, situated on an island in the Seine"; at the island there was a wooden bridge, which his men repaired. Roman Meledunum was a mutatio where fresh horses were kept available for official couriers on the Roman road south-southeast of Paris, where it forded the Seine. Around 500 A.D, Clovis I granted Melun to a Gallo-Roman magnate, Aurelianus, who had fought for Clovis several times and apparently influenced his conversion to Christianity.

The Normans sacked it in 845. The castle of Melun became a royal residence of the Capetian kings. Hugh Capet (See also: House of Capet) gave Melun to Bouchard, his favorite. In the reign of Hugh's son, Robert II of France, Eudes, the count of Champagne, bought the city, but the king took it back for Bouchard in 999. The chatelain Gautier and his wife, who had sold the city, were hanged; Eudes escaped. Robert died there in July 1031.

Robert of Melun (c. 1100 – 27 February 1167) was an English scholastic Christian theologian who taught in France, and later became Bishop of Hereford in England. He studied under Peter Abelard in Paris before teaching there and at Melun, which gave him his surname.

In July 1415, Melun was besieged by King Henry V of England, who had recently signed the Treaty of Troyes with King Charles VI of France. The town was in the hands of the Dauphin, later Charles VII of France, who had been dispossessed by the treaty. The defenders were led by Arnaud Guillaume, seigneur de Barbazan, and fought off the besiegers for fourteen weeks before capitulating. The town was liberated by Joan of Arc on 17 April 1430.

Counts of Melun
Aurelianus (c. 500)
Donatus (?-834)
Bouchard I (956/967–1005), also Count of Vendôme and Count of Paris

Viscounts of Melun
The early viscounts of Melun were listed by 17th and 18th century genealogists, notably Père Anselme. Based on closer reading of the original documents, Adolphe Duchalais constructed this list of viscounts in 1844:

Salo (c. 993; possibly legendary)
Joscelin I (c. 998)
William (possibly c. 1000)
Ursio (c. 1067–1085)
William the Carpenter (c. 1094)
Hilduin, Garin, Ursio II, Jean (unknown dates, possibly not viscounts)
Adam (c. 1138–1141; married Mahaut, daughter of his predecessor)
Joscelin II (c. 1156)

The title eventually became an honorary peerage. Such viscounts include Honoré Armand de Villars and Claude Louis Hector de Villars.

Population

Climate

Transport

Melun is served by the Gare de Melun, which is an interchange station on Paris RER line D, on the Transilien R suburban rail line, and on several national rail lines.

Main sights
The Collegiate Church of Notre-Dame, Melun was the original home of the Melun Diptych.

The nearby château of Vaux-le-Vicomte is considered a smaller predecessor of Palace of Versailles.

The officers' school of the French Gendarmerie is located in Melun.

Notable people 
Melun is the birthplace of:
 Morgan Ciprès, pair skater 
 Jérémie Bela, footballer
 Willy Boly, footballer
 Pierre Certon (c.1510-1520-1572), composer of the Renaissance (probably born in Melun)
 Jacques Amyot (1513–1593), writer
 Chimène Badi (1982–), singer
 Samir Beloufa (1979–), professional footballer
 Raphaël Desroses, basketball player
 Khamis Digol, footballer
 Stéphane Dondon, basketball player
 Grégory Guilvert, racing driver
 Judah of Melun (13th century), French rabbi and tosafist
 Yvan Kibundu, footballer
 Godson Kyeremeh, footballer
 Edmé-François Mallet (1713–1755), theologian and encyclopédiste
 Steven Mouyokolo, footballer
 Granddi Ngoyi, footballer
 Yrétha Silété, figure skater
 Oumar Solet, footballer
 Bertrand Grospellier (1981–), poker player
 William the Carpenter, viscount of Melun in the 11th century
 Jean-Baptiste Djebbari, politician and former Minister of Transport

Education

A campus of the École nationale de l'aviation civile (French civil aviation university) is located in Melun.

Public high schools/sixth form colleges:
 Lycée Léonard de Vinci
 Lycée Jacques-Amyot
 Lycée Georges Sand

There is one private high school/sixth form college:
 Lycée Saint Aspais

Twin towns – sister cities

Melun is twinned with:
 Crema, Italy
 Spelthorne, England, United Kingdom
 Vaihingen (Stuttgart), Germany

See also
Communes of the Seine-et-Marne department

References

Sources
 Initial text from the "Carpenters' Encyclopedia of Carpenters 2001" Compiled by John R. Carpenter.
 The Viscounts and Counts of Melun are listed in Detlev Schwennicke, Europäische Stammtafeln, Neue Folge, Volume VII, Tafels 55 & 56.

External links

 
  
 Tourist office website 
 1999 Land Use, from IAURIF (Institute for Urban Planning and Development of the Paris-Île-de-France région) 
 

 
Communes of Seine-et-Marne
Prefectures in France
Senones